William Russel Buck (born December 27, 1950) is an American bryologist.

Publications 
 ,  (1986) Suggestions for a new familial classification of pleurocarpous mosses. Taxon 35 (1): 21-60.
 ,  (2000) Morphology and classification of mosses. pp. 71-123 in Shaw, A. J. & B. Goffinet (eds.) Bryophyte Biology, 1st ed.  Cambridge University Press. ISBN 0-521-66097-1
Systematics and Biodiversity 2: 121-145.
 ,  (2004) Systematics of the Bryophyta (Mosses): From molecules to a revised classification. Monographs in Systematic Botany [Molecular Systematics of Bryophytes] 98: 205–239. ISBN 1-930723-38-5
Bryophyte Biology, 2nd ed. Cambridge University Press. 

References

1950 births
Living people
Bryologists